The 564th Air Defense Group  is a disbanded United States Air Force organization.  Its last assignment was with the 4707th Air Defense Wing, stationed at Otis Air Force Base, Massachusetts, where it was inactivated in 1955.  The group was originally activated as a support unit for a combat group at the end of World War II but never deployed before it was inactivated in 1945.

The group was activated once again in 1952 to replace the support elements of the inactivating 33d Fighter-Interceptor Wing.  A year later ADC established it as an operational headquarters for fighter-interceptor squadrons as well.  It was replaced in 1955 when ADC transferred its mission, equipment, and personnel to the 33d Fighter Group in a project that replaced air defense groups commanding fighter squadrons with fighter groups with distinguished records during World War II.

History

World War II
The group was activated during World War II as the 564th Air Service Group in 1944 and trained to support a single combat group in an overseas theater. Its 995th Air Engineering Squadron would provide maintenance that was beyond the capability of the combat group, its 1002nd Air Materiel Squadron would handle all supply matters, and its Headquarters & Base Services Squadron would provide other support. The group was inactivated before it could be deployed overseas. It was disbanded in 1948.

Cold War

During the Cold War the group was reconstituted, redesignated as the 564th Air Base Group, and activated at Otis Air Force Base in 1952 in a major reorganization of Air Defense Command (ADC) responding to ADC's difficulty under the existing wing base organizational structure in deploying fighter squadrons to best advantage. It replaced the 33rd Air Base Group as USAF host unit for Otis.  The group was assigned eight squadrons to perform its support responsibilities. It also assumed aircraft maintenance responsibility from the 33d Maintenance & Supply Group for units stationed at Otis. The operational elements of the inactivating 33d Fighter-Interceptor Wing were assigned to the 4707th Air Defense Wing.

In 1953 the group was redesignated as the 564th Air Defense Group and assumed responsibility for air defense of the Boston area.  It was assigned the 58th Fighter-Interceptor Squadron (FIS), flying Lockheed F-94 Starfire aircraft equipped with air intercept radar and armed with cannon, from the 4707th Defense Wing as its operational element. The 58th FIS was already stationed at Otis. In April 1953, the 437th FIS, flying a newer model of the F-94 aircraft armed with Mighty Mouse rockets, was activated as a second operational squadron. The 58th FIS upgraded to the newer F-94s by June 1953 and both squadrons converted to Northrop F-89 Scorpion aircraft in June 1955. The group was inactivated and replaced by the 33d Fighter Group (Air Defense) on 18 August 1955 as result of ADC's Project Arrow, which was designed to bring back on the active list the fighter units which had compiled memorable records in the two world wars. The group was disbanded once again in 1984.

Lineage
 Constituted as 564th Air Service Group in 1944
 Activated on 5 December 1944
 Inactivated on 30 June 1945
 Disbanded on 8 October 1948
 Reconstituted and redesignated 564th Air Base Group on 1 January 1952
 Activated on 1 February 1952
 Redesignated as 564th Air Defense Group on 16 February 1953
 Inactivated on 18 August 1955
 Disbanded on 27 September 1984

Assignments
 San Antonio Air Technical Service Command, 5 December 1944 – 30 June 1945
 4707th Defense Wing (later 4707th Air Defense Wing), 1 February 1952 – 18 August 1955

Stations
 Stinson Field, Texas, 5 December 1944 – 30 June 1945
 Otis Air Force Base, Massachusetts, 1 February 1952 – 18 August 1955

Components

Operational Squadrons
 58th Fighter-Interceptor Squadron, 16 February 1953 – 18 August 1955
 437th Fighter-Interceptor Squadron, 27 April 1953 – 18 August 1955

Support Squadrons

 12th WAF (Women in the Air Force) Squadron, ca. 1 July 1952 – 8 September 1954
 564th Air Police Squadron, 1 February 1952 – 18 August 1955
 564th Food Service Squadron, 1 February 1952 – 18 August 1955
 564th Field Maintenance Squadron, 1 February 1952 – 18 August 1955
 564th Installations Squadron, 1 February 1952 – 18 August 1955
 564th Medical Squadron (later 564th USAF Hospital), 16 February 1953 – 18 August 1955

 564th Motor Vehicle Squadron, 1 February 1952 – 18 August 1955
 564th Operations Squadron, 1 February 1952 – 18 August 1955
 564th Supply Squadron, 1 February 1952 – 18 August 1955
 995th Air Engineering Squadron, 5 December 1944 – 30 June 1945
 1002nd Air Materiel Squadron, 5 December 1944 – 30 June 1945
 4651st WAF (Women in the Air Force) Squadron 1 February 1952 – ca. 1 July 1952

Aircraft
 Northrop F-89D Scorpion, 1955
 Lockheed F-94B Starfighter, 1953
 Lockheed F-94C Starfighter, 1953–1955

Commanders
 Unknown, 5 December 1944 – 9 December 1944
 Maj. Joseph D. Clemens, 9 December 1944 – 11 December 1944
 Lt Col. Lawrence L. Martin, 11 December 1944 – 12 December 1944
 Lt Col. Clifford R. Rassmussen, 12 December 1944 – 6 March 1945
 Lt Col. Hugh H. Master, 6 March 1945 – 30 June 1945
 Unknown, 1952 – 1953
 Col. Luther H. Richmond, 1953 – 18 August 1955

See also
 Aerospace Defense Command Fighter Squadrons
 F-89 Scorpion units of the United States Air Force
 F-94 Starfire units of the United States Air Force

References

Notes

Bibliography

 Buss, Lydus H.(ed), Sturm, Thomas A., Volan, Denys, and McMullen, Richard F., History of Continental Air Defense Command and Air Defense Command July to December 1955, Directorate of Historical Services, Air Defense Command, Ent AFB, CO, (1956)
 
 
 Grant, C.L., (1961) The Development of Continental Air Defense to 1 September 1954, USAF Historical Study No. 126

Further reading

External links
 
 

0564
Aerospace Defense Command units
Military units and formations disestablished in 1948
Military units and formations established in 1952
Military units and formations disestablished in 1984